Balance of contract is a term used in the retail industry. Retailers contract with their suppliers to supply a quantity of product in a specified time period to a specific location at an agreed price.   The retailer "calls off" the production of the product to match the expected or actual sales curves, depending on the stage in the life-cycle of the product. At any one point in the life-cycle of the product, the "balance of contract" is the undelivered portion of the contract to which the retailer is committed in the future.

A "balanced contract" between two parties should have equal stakes and liabilities for both, through all stages of execution of the contract. An unbalanced contract, providing greater options to one party and restricting options of the other party, may be set aside in the court of law.

References 

Retail processes and techniques
Payment methods in retailing